The Herbert Claiborne Pell Cup, established in 1958, is presented by the Ida Lewis Yacht Club, of Newport, Rhode Island, to the winner of the Challenger Selection Series for the America's Cup. The Cup is named for Herbert Claiborne Pell, Jr.

The America's Cup was held in Newport through 1983. The Pell Cup, dating from 1958, is the senior most trophy presented to the Challenger and has all the Challengers engraved on it since 1962. Since 1983 and the advent of sports marketing, the Cup has been accompanied by the Louis Vuitton Cup until 2017, and the Prada Cup since 2021.

Emirates Team New Zealand won the Herbert Claiborne Pell Cup in the 2017 Bermuda competition.

See also
 Louis Vuitton Cup
 Prada Cup

References

Challenger Selection Series
Awards established in 1958
1958 establishments in Rhode Island